The Industry Hills Expo Center is an  in the City of Industry, California, United States. The multi-purpose arena seats over 5,000 spectators and was home to the Los Angeles Lynx of the National Indoor Football League. Built in 1981, the venue has other smaller buildings along with outdoor horse arenas.

The venue is one of the top venues for motorcycle speedway in the United States.

References

External links
Official website

Indoor arenas in California
Sports venues in Greater Los Angeles
Sports venues completed in 1981
City of Industry, California
1981 establishments in California